Lisa Pifer (born 1967), also known as Lisafer, is an American bass player and songwriter from Los Angeles. She has played in many punk bands, including U.X.A., Nina Hagen, D.I., Snap-her, and Lisafer. She is of German-Dutch descent.

Pifer grew up around musicians, most notably the Electric Prunes as her mother's close friend Pamela was married to James Lowe the Prunes' singer.
The Prunes were her first look into the music world and Lisa took piano lessons and wrote songs as a child due to their influence. It was a permanent impression that has lasted.

During the early 1980s, Lisa got into the punk scene and saw many of the pioneering punk bands perform and was forever hooked on the energy that spewed out of them. The anger, the force, and the attitude.

It was in the 1990s that she joined Snap-Her & recorded her first punk songs. This all-girl line-up was featured on the cover of Flipside Fanzine. Many said it was due to their short skirts and garter belts. Soon after, they were signed to the New Red Archives label out of San Francisco and run by UK Subs guitarist Nicky Garratt, who released the first full-length Snap-Her album "It Smells, It Burns, It Stings".

From 2004 - 2009, Lisa played with Dinah Cancer & the Grave Robbers which has morphed into the return of 45 Grave with guitar legend Rikk Agnew of Christian Death on guitar.  In July 2012, Lisa has joined forces with Texacala Jones in Hey!  Roll tape forward to November 2013..... Lisa joined forces with Arthur Hays (the Next, Mystery Dates, Hickoids) & J.r. Delgado to front their newest project called Screech of Death and slings bass in The Next (feat. Ty Gavin - S.A. Creeper, the Next, Screwballs).

As of 2018,  Screech of Death has Bill "Robert Conn" De Gidio of the Pagans
providing his guitar prowess.  Lisa continues to record and play on.

References

External links 
 New Red Archives Website

1967 births
Living people
American punk rock bass guitarists
American women guitarists
Women bass guitarists
Guitarists from Los Angeles
20th-century American bass guitarists
20th-century American women musicians
21st-century American women
Women in punk